Paritala Sunitha is an Indian politician. She is a member of the Legislative Assembly and Minister of SERP, Women Empowerment, Child Welfare, Disabled and Senior Citizens Welfare of the Indian state of Andhra Pradesh representing the Raptadu constituency of Anantapur. She represents the Telugu Desam Party.

Personal life
Paritala Sunitha was married to Paritala Ravindra. She has three children. She has three siblings and one nephew named Lakshmi Guntur, Dharmavarapu Balaji, Dharmavarapu Murali and Dharmavarapu Chetan Ravindra

Political career 
Paritala Sunitha entered politics following the death of her husband. She was elected as a Member of Legislative Assembly (MLA) for Raptadu constituency in 2009 and 2014 elections. She has not contested the 2019 elections to pave the path for her son, Paritala Sriram.

Popular culture
Ram Gopal Varma made the film, Rakta Charitra, based on the life of her husband. Radhika Apte played her character while Vivek Oberoi played her husband.

References

Living people
Telugu Desam Party politicians
Andhra Pradesh MLAs 2009–2014
Andhra Pradesh MLAs 2014–2019
People from Anantapur district
Women members of the Andhra Pradesh Legislative Assembly
Telugu politicians
21st-century Indian women politicians
21st-century Indian politicians
Year of birth missing (living people)